For the American film director see Adam Christian Clark. For the British theologian, see Adam Clarke.

Adam James Clark is an American meteorologist at the Cooperative Institute for Mesoscale Meteorological Studies (CIMMS) and the National Severe Storms Laboratory (NSSL) recognized for contributions to numerical modeling of convection.

Clark earned B.S., M.S., and Ph.D. degrees in meteorology from Iowa State University (ISU) in 2004, 2006, and 2009, respectively. In 2009 he joined NSSL as a National Research Council post-doctoral research associate under David Stensrud and soon became a research scientist at CIMMS/NSSL. He is also an assistant professor at the affiliated University of Oklahoma (OU). On December 23, 2013, Clark was selected by President Barack Obama for the prestigious Presidential Early Career Award for Scientists and Engineers (PECASE), which was awarded at a White House ceremony on April 15, 2014.

References

External links
 Three NOAA scientists honored by White House (NOAA)

American meteorologists
Iowa State University alumni
University of Oklahoma faculty
Storm chasers
Living people
Year of birth missing (living people)